Gil Hoffman is an Israeli journalist and political correspondent who serves as executive director of Honest Reporting. He was previously chief political correspondent for the Jerusalem Post.

Early life 
Hoffman grew up outside of Chicago in Lincolnwood, Illinois. He attended high school at Ida Crown Jewish Academy and graduated magna cum laude from Northwestern University's Medill School of Journalism. He previously worked for the Miami Herald and the Arizona Republic. He made Aliyah at age 22 in 1999. After immigrating to Israel, Hoffman served in an artillery unit with the Israel Defense Forces (IDF) and later served as a spokesperson for the IDF reserves.

Career
Hoffman became executive director of Honest Reporting in June of 2022. He worked for the Jerusalem Post from 1998 - 2022 and served as their long-time chief political correspondent where he interviewed prime ministers, generals, government ministers and other prominent politicians and covered 10 Knesset elections. Hoffman has noted in the past it is important to him to remain objective in speaking about Israel due to his position as chief political correspondent.

Hoffman hosted the podcast Inside Israel Today on The Land of Israel Network from 2017 - 2020. He hosted a podcast on Voice of Israel from 2014 - 2015.

He makes regular appearances on CNN, TRT World, and Al-Jazeera along with local Israeli television programs. He is a frequent lecturer on Israel, having spoken in every major English-speaking country in the world and all 50 U.S. states. Hoffman also teaches a course on journalism at the College of Management Academic Studies.

In 2022 Hoffman was named one of the top 100 people positively influencing Jewish life.

Personal life 
According to Jerusalem Press Club, Hoffman currently resides in Israel. He is married and has three children.

References 

Living people
Israeli journalists
Israeli columnists
The Jerusalem Post people
The Jerusalem Post
Israeli radio presenters
Israeli broadcasters
Israeli radio journalists
Northwestern University alumni
Year of birth missing (living people)